Qeshlaq-e Gurchinlu may refer to:
 Qeshlaq-e Gurchinlu Hajj Beyuk
 Qeshlaq-e Gurchinlu Hajj Najaf